North Asian tick typhus also known as Siberian tick typhus, is a condition characterized by a maculopapular rash.

It is associated with Rickettsia sibirica.

See also 
 Flinders Island spotted fever
 Queensland tick typhus
 List of cutaneous conditions

References

External links 

Bacterium-related cutaneous conditions
Typhus
Tick-borne diseases